The Gagu people are a south-central Ivory Coast ethnic group, likely the first in the region.

Culture 

In addition to farming, the Gagu also hunt and gather. They make clothing from bark. In the 21st century, the Gagu acculaturated to the Guro language, which many Gagu speak as their primary language.

Population 

The Gagu population totaled 25,000 in the mid-1990s and 61,000 in the mid-2010s.

References

Bibliography 

 
 

Ethnic groups in Ivory Coast